The Filipino Premier League was the top-level football league of the Philippines, operating under the country's football governing body, the Philippine Football Federation. The league was announced on August 2, 2008, and started on September 21, 2008.  It was replaced by the United Football League in 2009.

The league was not fully professional.

The only 2008–2009 season was supposed to have three regional tournaments, one each in Luzon, Visayas, and Mindanao which was supposed to be followed by the Filipino Premier League National Championships to be held in late 2009. The Visayas and Mindanao regional tournaments supposed to be held in the first half of 2009 did not pushed through, as well as the subsequent national championship.

2008 Filipino Premier League

Clubs 

 Arirang F.C.
 Ateneo F.C.
 Diliman F.C.
 Giligan's F.C.
 Mendiola United F.C.
 Pasargad F.C.
 Philippine Army F.C.
 Union F.C.

Group stage 
The season began on September 21, 2008, and ended on December 14, 2008.

Final round

Semifinals

Third place

Final

References 

Phil
Defunct football leagues in the Philippines
Sports leagues established in 2008
Sports leagues disestablished in 2008